Liberalism in Uruguay organized itself in the nineteenth century in the Colorado (or Red) Party, (Partido Colorado) nowadays an heterogeneous party, divided in factions ranging from Moderate to social democracy. Its general profile is more or less liberal. They can differ very much in political profile. Liberal forces are not only active in the Colorado Party and this party has also moderate factions.

The timeline

Colorado Party
1836: The supporters of general Rivera during the civil war formed the liberal Colorado Party or Red Party (Partido Colorado). This party is led in the beginning of the twentieth century by José Batlle y Ordóñez.
1976: The party is banned.
1985: The party is reinstated under the leadership of Julio María Sanguinetti.

Liberal leaders
 Partido Colorado: José Batlle y Ordóñez - Julio María Sanguinetti

See also
 History of Uruguay
 Politics of Uruguay
 List of political parties in Uruguay

References 

Uruguay
Political movements in Uruguay